Ohnstad is a surname. Notable people with the surname include:

Mike Ohnstad (born 1926), American politician
Tod Ohnstad (born 1952), American labor union official, machinist, and politician

See also
Onstad